Aleksandr Vtorov (born 1916, date of death unknown) was a Soviet equestrian. He competed in two events at the 1956 Summer Olympics.

References

1916 births
Year of death missing
Soviet male equestrians
Olympic equestrians of the Soviet Union
Equestrians at the 1956 Summer Olympics
Place of birth missing